Military Merit Medal or Medal of Military Merit may refer to:

 Argentine Army Military Merit Medal
 Military Merit Medal (Austria–Hungary)
 Military Merit Medal (Bavaria), see Orders, decorations, and medals of the German Empire
 Medal of Military Merit (Greece)
 Military Merit Medal (Philippines)
 Medal for Military Merit (Republika Srpska)
 Military Merit Medal (South Africa)
 Medal of Military Merit (Uruguay)
 Military Merit Medal (Vietnam)

See also
 Military Merit Cross (disambiguation)
 Military Merit Order (disambiguation)
 Order of Military Merit (disambiguation)

Military awards and decorations